The 2020–21 season was FC Chernihiv's inaugural season. It competed in the Ukrainian Second League.

Players

Squad information

Transfers

In

Out

Competitions

Overview

Ukrainian Second League

League table group A 

|source=pfl.ua  
}}

Ukrainian Cup

Competitions

Ukrainian Second League

Results

Statistics

Appearances and goals 

|-
! colspan=16 style=background:#dcdcdc; text-align:center| Goalkeepers

|-
! colspan=17 style=background:#dcdcdc; text-align:center| Defenders

|-
! colspan=16 style=background:#dcdcdc; text-align:center| Midfielders 

|-
! colspan=16 style=background:#dcdcdc; text-align:center| Forwards

|-
! colspan=16 style=background:#dcdcdc; text-align:center| Players transferred out during the season

 
Last updated: 10 April 2021

Goalscorers 

Last updated: 1 May 2021

Clean sheets 

Last updated: 11 April 2021

References

External links 

 

FC Chernihiv
FC Chernihiv seasons
FC Chernihiv